Spelling is a set of conventions that regulate the way of using graphemes (writing system) to represent a language in its written form. In other words, spelling is the rendering of speech sound (phoneme) into writing (grapheme). Spelling is one of the elements of orthography, and highly standardized spelling is a prescriptive element.

Spellings originated as transcriptions of the sounds of spoken language according to the alphabetic principle. They remain largely reflective of the sounds, although fully phonemic spelling is an ideal that most languages' orthographies only approximate, some more closely than others. This is true for various reasons, including that pronunciation changes over time in all languages, yet spellings as visual norms may resist change. In addition, words from other languages may be adopted without being adapted to the spelling system, and different meanings of a word or homophones may be deliberately spelled in different ways to differentiate them visually.

Spelling standards and conventions 
Standardization of spelling is connected with the development of writing and the establishment of modern standard dialects. Languages with established orthography are those languages that enjoy an official status and a degree of institutional support in a country. Therefore, normative spelling is a relatively recent development linked to the compiling of dictionaries (in many languages, special spelling dictionaries, also called orthographic dictionaries, are compiled, showing prescribed spelling of words but not their meanings), the founding of national academies and other institutions of language maintenance, including widespread education and literacy, and often does not apply to minority and regional languages.

In countries or regions where there is an authoritative language academy, such as France, the Netherlands, and the German-speaking areas, reforms are regularly made so that spelling better matches the changing pronunciation.

Examples include:
 German orthography reform of 1996 
 Portuguese spelling reform
 French rectifications orthographiques of 1990.

English-language spelling reform proposals have been regularly made since the 16th century, but have made little impact apart from a few spellings preferred by Noah Webster having contributed to American and British English spelling differences.

Methodology

Learning
Learning proper spelling by rote is a traditional element of elementary education and divergence from standard spelling is often perceived as an indicator of low intelligence, illiteracy, or lower class standing.

Spelling tests are commonly used to assess a student's mastery over the words in the spelling lessons the student has received so far. They can also be an effective practice method. Spelling bees are competitions to determine the best speller of a group.  Prominent spelling bees are even televised, such as the National Spelling Bee in the United States.

Alteration

Divergent spelling is a popular advertising technique, used to attract attention or to render a trademark "suggestive" rather than "merely descriptive". The pastry chains Dunkin' Donuts and Krispy Kreme, for example, employ non-standard spellings.

Misspellings

While some words admit multiple spellings, some spellings are not considered standard. These are commonly called "misspellings". A misspelled word can be a series of letters that represents no correctly spelled word of the same language at all (such as "leik" for "like") or a correct spelling of another word (such as writing "here" when one means "hear", or "no" when one means "know"). Misspellings of the latter type are called "atomic typos" and it can easily make their way into printed material because they are not caught by simple computerized spell checkers.

Misspellings may be due to typing errors (e.g. the transposition error teh for the), lack of knowledge of the normative spelling, or lack of concern over spelling rules at all. Whether or not a word is misspelled may depend on context and the orthographic conventions adopted, as is the case with American / British English distinctions. Misspelling can also be a matter of opinion when variant spellings are accepted by some and not by others. For example, "miniscule" (for "minuscule") is a misspelling to many, and yet it is listed as an acceptable variant in some dictionaries.

A well-known Internet scam involves the registration of domain names that are deliberate misspellings of well-known corporate names to mislead or defraud. The practice is commonly known as "typosquatting".

Notable English misspellings in history 

 Arab, Alabama – This town in north Alabama was named Arad, after its founder, Arad Thompson, but the name was misspelled on a US Post Office map as "Arab", and the misspelled name stuck.
 Cleveland, Ohio – the leader of the crew that surveyed the town's territory was General Moses Cleaveland, and the region was named in his honor; reportedly the town's first newspaper, the Cleveland Advertiser, could not fit the town's name in its masthead without removing the first "a" from the name.
 Google – accidental misspelling of googol. According to Google's vice president, as quoted on a BBC The Money Programme documentary, January 2006, the founders – noted for their poor spelling – registered Google as a trademark and web address before someone pointed out that it was not correct.
 Ovaltine, a popular bedtime drink in the UK and Australia, came about because someone misspelled the original name Ovomaltine on the trademark documentation.
 Referer – common misspelling of the word referrer. It is so common that it made it into the official specification of HTTP – the communication protocol of the World Wide Web – and has, therefore, become the standard industry spelling when discussing HTTP referers.
Sequim, Washington – "In 1879 the first post office was built and named 'Seguin' for the surrounding area. [...] In 1907, due to a Postal Official's error in reading an official report, the post office was titled 'Seguim' for approximately a month. With the next report, the Official read the letter 'g' as a 'q', and the post office here became known as 'Sequim.' The name change did not worry the residents enough to protest. It has been known as Sequim ever since."<ref>{{cite web |author=Robinson, J. |year=2005 |title= Sequim History |access-date=July 24, 2008 |publisher= City of Sequim, Washington |url=http://www.ci.sequim.wa.us/planning/ParksPlan/AppendexC.pdf }}</ref>
 According to some, the name of Quartzsite, a mining town in Arizona, was spelled wrongly. It should be Quartzite, after the mineral quartzite.
 Zenith – Arabic zamt was misread; in Latin letters, at the time, the letter i was never dotted, so "m" looked like "ni".

In English
English orthography has a broad degree of standardization. However, there are several ways to spell almost every sound and most letters have several variants of pronunciation depending on their position in the word and context. Therefore, some spelling mistakes are common even among native speakers. This is mainly due to large number of words that were borrowed from other languages with no successful attempts of complete spelling reform. Most spelling rules usually do not reflect phonetic changes that have taken place since the end of the 15th century (for example, Great Vowel Shift).

Other languages
Portuguese spelling is not strictly phonematic. It is associated with an extension of the Portuguese language and the emergence of numerous regional and dialect variants. In 2009 the global reform of the Portuguese language was initiated to eliminate 98% of inconsistencies in spelling between various countries. 
 
Orthography of the Icelandic language is based on etymological principle, thus the Icelanders themselves experience difficulties in writing. Modern Icelandic alphabet is based on the standard introduced by the Danish philologist Rasmus Rask.
 
The fundamental principles of the Spanish orthography are phonological and etymological, that is why there are several letters with identical phonemes. Beginning from the 17th century, various options for orthographic reforms were suggested that would create a one-to-one correspondence between grapheme and phoneme, but all of them were rejected. Most modern proposals to reform spelling are limited to the removal of homophone letters that are preserved for etymological reasons.

See also

 Dyslexia
 Eye dialect
 Grapheme
 Official script

 Orthography
 Phonetic spelling
 Pronunciation spelling
 Register (sociolinguistics)
 Spell checker

 Spelling bee
 Spelling pronunciation
 Spelling reform

English spelling

 American and British English spelling differences
 English orthography
 English terms with diacritical marks

 English spelling reform
 Pronunciation respelling for English

 Commonly misspelled English words
 Frequently misused words

Other languages

 
 List of languages by writing system
 French orthography

 German orthography
 Greek orthography
 Hangul orthography
 Italian orthography

 Latin spelling and pronunciation
 Russian orthography
 Spanish orthography

References

Further reading

 
 

External links

Ford, O.T. BASIC LINGUISTICS OF ENGLISH''. The Stewardship Project. (Concept of spelling)
 

 
Orthography